TWB may refer to:
 Teachers Without Borders
 Translators Without Borders
 The Washington Ballet
 Toowoomba City Aerodrome, Queensland, Australia (IATA code TWB)
 Tweedbank railway station, Scottish Borders, UK (station code TWB)
 T'way Air, by ICAO airline designator